Allan P. Grigg, better known by his stage name Kool Kojak and stylized as "KoOoLkOjAk", is an American musician, songwriter, record producer, composer, and artist notable for music in Spider-Man: Into the Spider Verse, co-writing and co-producing Flo Rida's #1 Billboard hit single "Right Round", Doja Cat's hit single "Cyber Sex", Nicki Minaj's hit single "Va Va Voom", The Boss Baby Theme, and Ke$ha's top 10 single "Blow". Kool Kojak has written and produced for artists such as Sean Paul, Yelle, Waka Flocka Flame, Travis Barker, actor Ed Helms, Britney Spears, Jesse and Joy, Andy Milonakis, Icona Pop, Matisyahu, Onyx, comedian Chelsea Peretti, N.A.S.A., Dirt Nasty, Lordz of Brooklyn, Ursula 1000, Phil Greiss and Warren G. Kool Kojak has created original music for many major motion pictures. He was a featured producer on the Simon Cowell TV program X Factor and has appeared as himself on the Nickelodeon show Victorious. He has won two ASCAP Pop Awards and one ASCAP Urban Award, a WormTown Sound Award, and has been awarded the Key to the City of Worcester, Massachusetts.

Early life and music career
Kool Kojak was born and raised in Worcester, Massachusetts, where he created the 1980's underground cassette legends IYF Productions. After studying under Archie Shepp at The University of Massachusetts, Kojak began professionally creating music in 1995, DJing, playing in bands, and producing hip-hop records in Manhattan, Brooklyn, and Harlem. His first commercial success was as composer and producer of the Brazilian multi platinum selling #1 Splenda album O Charada Brasileiro. This album sold 16 million copies on the Brasilian bootleg street market. 

Kojak served as musical director and performer for the live Supla show, which took the stage at Rock in Rio 3, in Rio de Janeiro, Brazil in 2001.

Select production discography

Art
Kool Kojak is also a graffiti artist and sculptor in the US and Brazil. His body of art includes an album cover for Ultramagnetic MCs and New York City murals he painted for 1990's Free Tibet Campaign. In Brazil early 2000's, Kool Kojak provided hiphop and graffiti symposiums for city run youth programs in the Favelas of São Paulo. He has painted murals with Brazilian artists, such as Os Gêmeos, Vitche, and Juneca. In 2013, Kool Kojak auctioned off a graffiti sculpture to benefit the Pete Carroll charity A Better L.A. Kool Kojak's artwork adorns the front doors of The Worcester Historical Museum, in Worcester, Massachusetts. His work is part of the permanent collection of the museum. In 2014, he collaborated with David Choe on a dress. Collectors of KoOoL kOjAk artwork include The Disney Corporation, Sony Pictures, The Worcester Historical Museum, Carly Rae Jepsen, Julia Michaels, Claude Kelly, Martin Johnson, Peter Svensson and Ammo Pro.

Filmography

References

External links
 Kool Kojak on IMDb

Living people
Record producers from Massachusetts
Songwriters from Massachusetts
American emigrants to Brazil
Year of birth missing (living people)
People from Cubatão